Diane Bourgeois (born November 14, 1949) is a Canadian politician. She was a Bloc Québécois Member of the House of Commons of Canada, representing the riding Terrebonne—Blainville from 2000 until 2011. She was the Bloc critic for the international cooperation portfolio — Canada's foreign-aid efforts — and is a former critic for the status of women, parental leave, and housing.

Bourgeois was born in Montreal, Quebec.

Electoral record

External links
 
 How'd They Vote?: Diane Bourgeois' voting history and quotes

1949 births
Bloc Québécois MPs
Women members of the House of Commons of Canada
French Quebecers
Living people
Members of the House of Commons of Canada from Quebec
People from Blainville, Quebec
Politicians from Montreal
Women in Quebec politics
21st-century Canadian politicians
21st-century Canadian women politicians